DigiFX Interactive was an American video game developer with headquarters in Dallas, Texas. It was founded in November 1991 and went out of business in October 1997 after its publisher, Merit Studios, was dissolved. During its lifetime, it developed and released Command Adventures: Starship and The Fortress of Dr. Radiaki under the name of Future Vision, Inc. It also released Harvester under the name of DigiFX Interactive.

Due to the company's dissolution, several games were cancelled, including Mission to Nexus Prime, a strategy game which had a demo released. The studio was also working on a game engine named Exile, which would have 2D and 3D support.

References

External links
 Digifx.net at Wayback Machine (page saved in 14/06/1998)

Video game development companies

Video game companies established in 1991
Video game companies disestablished in 1997
Video game companies of the United States